Highstead is an estate in Groote Schuur and is the official residence of the Deputy President of South Africa when they are staying in Cape Town, South Africa. The house was built in the mid-20th century, and was originally a minister's house. In the late 1990s, the house was renovated and expanded.

References 

Buildings and structures in Cape Town